Melchior Otto Voit von Salzburg (1603–1653) was the Prince-Bishop of Bamberg from 1642 to 1653.

Biography

Melchior Otto von Voit von Salzburg was born in Eichenhausen, which is today part of Wülfershausen, on 19 June 1603.

He served as a Landrichter (judge) in Würzburg and later as cantor of Würzburg Cathedral.  

He was appointed Prince-Bishop of Bamberg on 25 August 1642, with Pope Urban VIII confirming his appointment on 5 May 1643.  He was never consecrated as a bishop, and died with the clerical rank of priest.

As bishop-elect, he founded the Ottoniana Academia (named after his patron saint, Otto of Bamberg), which later became the University of Bamberg.

He died on 4 January 1653.

References

1603 births
1653 deaths
Prince-Bishops of Bamberg